First published in 1936, Sir Percy Leads the Band is (chronologically) the second of the Scarlet Pimpernel series by Baroness Orczy.

The novel is set in January and February 1793 and follows on from the original Scarlet Pimpernel book.

References

External links
 

1936 British novels
Scarlet Pimpernel books
Novels by Baroness Emma Orczy
Fiction set in 1793
Hodder & Stoughton books